Punisher: In the Blood is a five-issue comic book limited series published by Marvel Comics. The Punisher faces the final battle against Jigsaw. The series was released in 2010 written by Rick Remender.

Publication history
In The Blood Part One, January 2011
In The Blood Part Two, February 2011
In The Blood Part Three, March 2011
In The Blood Part Four, April 2011
In The Blood Part Five, May 2011

Plot
Following the Dark Reign storyline, the Punisher started hunting the Hood but without results so he went after Microchip to make him pay for murdering G.W. Bridge.  Meanwhile, Microchip is knocked unconscious by Jigsaw.  At their hideout, Henry Russo tells the Punisher how he hated his father because he would constantly abuse his mother and idolized the Punisher for being a thorn in Jigsaw's side.  Henry suspects that his father may be alive and despite the Punisher's protests, goes to visit his mother to make sure; however, when he arrives, he is confronted by his father Jigsaw and Stuart Clarke.  Meanwhile, the Punisher heads to Microchip's lair but instead of finding his old partner, he finds a mysterious woman in black leather with seemingly burnt skin who then attacks him.  She called Frank in the story "Angel" and after she escaped, Frank suspected that he may know this woman.

Jigsaw and Stuart (now known as the Jigsaw brothers) tell Henry that Jigsaw is there protect him from the Punisher, believing he is attempting to kill him. Jigsaw escorts his son, Henry to his warehouse mansion. Stuart visits the warehouse mansion's captive Microchip. He explains that his girlfriend was killed by the Punisher and swears to make him accountable, but his revenge fails. Stuart walks away and tells him that the Punisher is coming. Meanwhile, the Punisher determined to find Microchip takes down multiple gangs to find his target and attacks Mirage and threatens him for everything he knows where Microchip is, but Mirage was shot by the mysterious woman. The Punisher believes that mysterious woman was his wife, Maria.

Sometime later, the Punisher cannot get over the fact Maria had been alive following her resurrection by the Hood and seemingly being burnt alive to torture him, the Punisher takes down more gangs seeking information of Jigsaw's whereabouts. Jigsaw and Stuart are planning to manipulate the Punisher. Later, The Punisher locates Jigsaw's hideout and kills Jigsaw's men, but the Punisher is confused when Henry confronts him, saying he knows the plans and shocks the Punisher with a taser. Jigsaw proud his son Henry has subdued the Punisher.

Jigsaw shows his son Henry the monitor renderings where Punisher is held captive, Jigsaw allows him to kill Microchip by slashing his throat. Jigsaw got inference by Stuart about his inheritance fund. Henry realizes his father is manipulating the Punisher and helps him escape. The Punisher confronts his wife, Maria but is unwilling to kill her, Maria attempts to burn him with a flamethrower, but the Punisher receives a call from Henry revealing that Maria is a female assassin posing as Maria. The Punisher kills the imposter. Henry is caught by Stuart, who cuts his arms with razor blades, but Jigsaw stabs Stuart, who tells him, he is wrong. Jigsaw promptly shoots Stuart, then attempts to kills his own son.

Jigsaw attacks his son in pain, until he stops upon seeing his young Henry, Jigsaw apologizes for what he did, but Henry kicks him away. With the warehouse on fire following the fight Henry escapes to the roof where he is met by the Punisher and Jigsaw. The Punisher and Jigsaw begin a brutal hand-to-hand fight during which Henry tells his father he wants a normal life. Jigsaw is able to render the Punisher unconscious but the roof gives way. Henry reaches for his father and grabs his arm trying to save him. Jigsaw smiles and lets go of Henry's arm taking his own life. Henry is about to fall in afterwards but is saved by the now conscious Punisher. The Punisher forces Henry to leave and not search for his father. Weeks later Henry and his mother are seen relaxing and beginning their new life free from Jigsaw.

See also
 2010 in comics

References

External links
 Punisher: In The Blood at the Comic Book DB

Comics set in New York City
In the Blood
Marvel Comics limited series